Omega Phi Chi Multicultural Sorority, Inc. is a national multicultural sorority that was established on November 9, 1988 at Rutgers University in New Brunswick, New Jersey by eight women of Asian, African American, and Latina descent.

History 
The founders of Omega Phi Chi were a group of eight women who felt the need to establish a multicultural organization on the campus of Rutgers University - New Brunswick that spoke to their needs across diverse backgrounds, distinct cultural roots, and the empowerment of the female culture. They came together to found a multicultural sorority; a different type of organization that would not be categorized by ethnicity, creed or culture. Since its inception, it has grown to include over 95 different nationalities and has started 24 chapters in New Jersey, New York, Florida, Arizona, Texas, Indiana, and California.

Founding Mothers

The founding mothers of Omega Phi Chi Multicultural Sorority Inc. are:

 Bernadette Santana - Filipina & Dominican
 Dawn Gonzalez - Puerto Rican
 Cindy Cumba - Puerto Rican & Mexican
 Stacy Richardson - African American
 Annette Cuevas - Puerto Rican
 Socorro Valle - Puerto Rican
 Tracie Davis - African American
 Magdaly Casillas - Puerto Rican

Purpose 
The purpose of Omega Phi Chi is to create a unity among all women and promote ethnic diversity by integrating women of all boundaries and cultures. Omega Phi Chi's concept of sisterhood are love, honesty, loyalty, responsibility of one another, and mutual respect. The main objectives of this organization are academic excellence and involvement in community affairs. In addition, Omega Phi Chi prides themselves in promoting professionalism.

Facts 
Colors: Perfect Pink and Onyx Black
Mascot: Black Panther
Flower: Lady's Pink Slipper known as Moccasin
Stone: Black Onyx
Core Values: Academic Excellence and Involvement in Community Affairs
We Step and We Stroll

Mottos:
"Destroying All Boundaries. Uniting All Races. Omega Phi Chi. We Dare to Be Different." 
"Preserving the Past, Cultivating the Present, Building the Future, Omega Phi Chi, We Dare To Be Different"

Undergraduate chapters 
The chapters of Omega Phi Chi:
 Alpha - Rutgers University - New Brunswick
 Beta - Rider University
 Gamma - New Jersey City University
 Delta - South Orange, New Jersey
 Epsilon - William Patterson University
 Zeta - The College of New Jersey
 Eta - Ramapo College of New Jersey
 Theta - Kean University
 Iota - State University of New York at New Paltz
 Kappa - Barry University 
 Lambda - Arizona State University
 Mu - Montclair State University
 Nu - Rutgers University - Newark
 Xi - Florida International University
 Omicron - Fairleigh Dickinson University - Teaneck
 Pi - Sam Houston State University
 Rho - California State University - Dominguez Hills
 Sigma - State University of New York - College at Buffalo
 Tau - Hofstra University
 Upsilon - Purdue University
 Phi - Felician University
 Chi - New Jersey Institute of Technology
 Psi - Fairleigh Dickinson University - Florham
 Omega - memorial
 Alpha Alpha - Rutgers University - Camden
 Alpha Beta - Washington State University 
 Alpha Gamma - Eastern Washington University

References

External links
Omega Phi Chi Sorority, Inc.

National Multicultural Greek Council
Student societies in the United States
Organizations established in 1988